ValueTales is a series of 43 simple biographical children's books published primarily by the now-defunct Value Communications, Inc. in La Jolla, California. They were written by Dr. Spencer Johnson and Ann Donegan Johnson, and illustrated by Stephen Pileggi.

Each book gives a simplified and semi-fictionalized biography of a historical figure as an allegory, illustrating the value of a characteristic. Each volume is a white pictorial glossy hardback book around 60 pages long with a brightly colored cartoon of the figure, along with some anthropomorphic item or animal that narrates the subject's life throughout the book.

The title of each book is The Value of x: The story of y , where x is the characteristic exemplified and y is the exemplary person (i.e. The Value of Determination: The Story of Helen Keller). Early editions of the books use a different format: The Valuetale of y: The value of x . So the first edition of the Helen Keller book is called The ValueTale of Helen Keller : the value of determination

The books were quite popular in homes, elementary school libraries, pediatrics offices, and sunday schools across North America. Most are out of print. In October 2010, Simon & Schuster Children's Books published anthologized five of the ValueTales books in an edition with new illustrations by Dan Andreason.

Books

External links
 ValueTales.com
 Dan Andreasen, children's book illustrator

Children's non-fiction books
American biographies
Series of children's books
Series of non-fiction books